Wogonin is an O-methylated flavone, a flavonoid-like chemical compound which is found in Scutellaria baicalensis.

The glycosides of wogonin are known as wogonosides.  For example, oroxindin is a wogonin glucuronide isolated from Oroxylum indicum. It is one of the active ingredients of Sho-Saiko-To, a Japanese herbal supplement.

Wogonin has been found in one study to have anxiolytic properties in mice at doses of 7.5 to 30 mg/kg, without exhibiting the sedative and muscle-relaxing properties of benzodiazepines.  Preliminary in vitro studies have shown pharmacological effects that indicate wogonin may have anti-tumor properties. Wogonin has also been found to possess anticonvulsant effects. It acts as a positive allosteric modulator of the benzodiazepine site of the GABAA receptor.

References 

O-methylated flavones
Resorcinols
Anxiolytics
Anticonvulsants
GABAA receptor positive allosteric modulators